Doneil Jor-Dee Ashley Henry (born April 20, 1993) is a Canadian professional soccer player who currently plays for Minnesota United of Major League Soccer and the Canada national team.

Club career

Early career
Henry's parents, Beverly and Menocal Henry, moved to Canada from Jamaica. He started playing soccer at age 10 and played youth soccer with the Brampton Youth Soccer Club and North Mississauga SC.

Toronto FC
Henry joined the Toronto FC Academy in November 2008, and captained the team through two seasons in the Canadian Soccer League in 2009 and 2010.

He appeared for Toronto FC in the 2010 Nutrilite Canadian Championship against the Vancouver Whitecaps and a 2010–11 CONCACAF Champions League qualifying match against Motagua. He also made his MLS debut and played in another 2010–11 CONCACAF Champions League match against Árabe Unido during the 2010 season. He also played in an international friendly against Bolton Wanderers. He signed with Toronto FC on August 26, 2010, becoming the first TFC Academy player to sign for the first team.

On June 15, 2011, in a 0–0 away draw against New England Revolution, Henry drew high praise from Taylor Twellman who was commentating on the game. After coming on for Richard Eckersley in the second half against Real Salt Lake on April 28, 2012, he scored his first goal for Toronto in the 77th minute in a 3–2 away defeat.  On August 21, the club announced that it had re-signed him to a long-term deal. During the 2011–12 CONCACAF Champions League, he made four appearances during the 2011 season and an appearance during the 2012 season. He also made two appearances in the 2012–13 CONCACAF Champions League during the 2012 season.

Henry scored his second goal for Toronto outside the penalty box in a 2–0 home victory over rival Montreal Impact in the Canadian Championship on April 24, 2013. Prior to the 2014 season, he spent some time training with Premier League side West Ham United. After scoring mid-week in the Canadian Championship against Montreal Impact, he scored the 92nd-minute game winner against Columbus Crew in a 3–2 home victory May 31, 2014.

Apollon Limassol
Henry was sold to 2014–15 UEFA Europa League and Cypriot First Division participants Apollon Limassol, for an undisclosed fee in April 2014 prior to the commencement of the 2014 MLS season. Toronto FC confirmed that the deal had a sell-on clause and they intended to enter into talks with Henry and Apollon Limassol with hope of keeping him on loan again for the 2015 MLS season.

West Ham United
Having previously had two training stints with West Ham in the Premier League after the player was recommended to manager Sam Allardyce by Ryan Nelsen, Henry signed for the club on January 3, 2015, on a "long term" contract for an undisclosed fee. He made his West Ham debut on August 6, 2015, in a 2–1 away defeat to Romanian side FC Astra in the Europa League qualifying stages. His team was eliminated as a result of the defeat. This was his only appearance and he left the club in December 2017 when his contract was cancelled by mutual consent.

Loans to Blackburn Rovers
On March 4, Henry was loaned by West Ham to Blackburn Rovers in the Football League Championship, on a one-month loan. He made his debut on the same day against Sheffield Wednesday, a 2–1 win for Rovers, a performance described by Rovers' manager, Gary Bowyer as "magnificent". In his second match for Blackburn on March 11, he got an assist in a 94th-minute goal from Jordan Rhodes to give them a 1–0 victory over Bolton Wanderers. In his third game for Blackburn, a 3–1 away win against Charlton Athletic, he sustained a hamstring injury that ended his season. With his loan cut short, he returned to West Ham United. He returned to Blackburn on loan on November 24, 2015.

Loan to AC Horsens
On August 31, 2016, Henry was loaned by West Ham to Danish Superliga club AC Horsens for half a season. 
On October 23 Henry started his first game in the starting line-up, against Randers FC. The game resulted in a clean sheet and 1–0 victory for Horsens and Henry. In Henry's second start with Horsens, he suffered an ACL tear, which would end his season. He went back to West Ham in start of January 2017.

Vancouver Whitecaps FC
On December 22, 2017, Henry was signed by Vancouver Whitecaps FC. On April 25, 2018, Henry was loaned to United Soccer League club Ottawa Fury until the end of May. According to Vancouver Whitecaps FC head coach Carl Robinson, the goal of the loan was to help Henry reach full fitness by getting competitive match time. Henry made three appearances for Ottawa, all clean sheets, but was forced to sit out the last two games of his loan, one due to bronchitis and one due to fatigue. On May 29, he was reported to have returned to Vancouver. Henry made his Whitecaps debut in June 2018, shortly after returning from Ottawa Fury on loan.

He scored his first league goal for Vancouver against Minnesota United in Vancouver's 2019 MLS season opener on March 2.

Suwon Samsung Bluewings
On November 20, 2019, Henry was transferred to South Korean K League side Suwon Samsung Bluewings for an undisclosed fee. He made his debut for Suwon in the AFC Champions League, starting in a group stage match against Vissel Kobe on February 19, 2020. Henry scored his first goal for the club on October 31, netting the opener in a 2-1 victory over Gangwon FC.

Los Angeles FC

In February 2022, Henry returned to MLS, signing with Los Angeles FC. On February 26, Henry made his debut with the club during LAFC's 3–0 win over the Colorado Rapids. Henry came into the match at the 86th minute as a substitute for Jesús Murillo. On July 3, 2022, after only appearing in 6 matches, Henry was waived by the club.

Return to Toronto FC
On July 22, 2022, Henry returned to his former club Toronto FC, signing a six-month deal through the end of 2022. He made his re-debut for Toronto the next day against Charlotte FC. After the end of the 2022 season, he departed the club, upon the expiry of his contract.

Minnesota United
In December 2022, Minnesota United announced they had claimed Henry off waivers.

International career

Youth 
Henry played three matches for the Canada U-20 men's national soccer team.

He was selected for the Canada U23 roster to partake in the 2012 CONCACAF Men's Olympic Qualifying Tournament. After sitting out the first game, he started and scoring the opening goal against the United States U23 as part of a 2–0 victory for Canada.

Senior 
Henry earned his first cap for Canada's senior team August 15, 2012, in a friendly against Trinidad and Tobago. He started the match before being subbed out at halftime for Pedro Pacheco, the game ended in a 2–0 victory. On December 10, 2012, he was awarded the 2012 Canadian U-20 Player of the Year, receiving 37.8% of the vote and just beating out Samuel Piette for the award.

On June 27, 2013, Henry was listed as a part of the confirmed 23-man squad for Colin Miller's Canada squad for 2013 CONCACAF Gold Cup.

Henry was named to the squad for the 2019 CONCACAF Gold Cup on May 30, 2019. He scored his first goal for Canada on September 7, 2019, against Cuba in a CONCACAF Nations League match. Henry was named to the squad for the 2021 CONCACAF Gold Cup on July 1, 2021.

Henry was expected to be named to the Canada squad for the 2022 FIFA World Cup, but during the warm-up prior to a pre-tournament friendly against Bahrain on November 11, he suffered an calf injury that ultimately ruled him out of the final squad.

Personal life
In December 2021, he was announced as a co-owner of expansion League1 Ontario club Simcoe County Rovers FC.

Career statistics

Club

International

International goals
Scores and results list Canada's goal tally first.

Honours 
Toronto FC
Canadian Championship: 2010, 2011, 2012
Individual
Canadian U-20 Players of the Year: 2012

References

External links
 
 
 
 

1993 births
Living people
Association football defenders
Canadian soccer players
Black Canadian soccer players
Canadian sportspeople of Jamaican descent
Toronto FC players
Apollon Limassol FC players
West Ham United F.C. players
Blackburn Rovers F.C. players
AC Horsens players
Vancouver Whitecaps FC players
Ottawa Fury FC players
Suwon Samsung Bluewings players
Minnesota United FC players
Canadian Soccer League (1998–present) players
Major League Soccer players
Cypriot First Division players
English Football League players
Danish Superliga players
USL Championship players
K League 1 players
Canada men's youth international soccer players
Canada men's under-23 international soccer players
Canada men's international soccer players
2013 CONCACAF Gold Cup players
2019 CONCACAF Gold Cup players
2021 CONCACAF Gold Cup players
Canadian expatriate soccer players
Expatriate footballers in Cyprus
Expatriate footballers in England
Expatriate men's footballers in Denmark
Expatriate footballers in South Korea
Canadian expatriate sportspeople in Cyprus
Canadian expatriate sportspeople in England
Canadian expatriate sportspeople in Denmark
Canadian expatriate sportspeople in South Korea
Homegrown Players (MLS)
North Mississauga SC players
Soccer players from Brampton
Simcoe County Rovers FC owners